The Arctic policy of Canada includes both the foreign policy of Canada in regard to the Arctic region and Canada's domestic policy towards its Arctic territories. This includes the devolution of powers to the territories. Canada's Arctic policy includes the plans and provisions of these regional governments. It encompasses the exercise of sovereignty, social and economic development, the protection of the environment, and the improving and devolving of governance.

Canada, along with the 7 other Arctic nations, is a member of the Arctic Council. On August 23, 2012, Prime Minister Stephen Harper announced that Nunavut MP Leona Aglukkaq would serve as chair of the Arctic Council when Canada assumed the Chairmanship from Sweden in May 2013.

Along with its mainland in the upper regions of North America, Canada claims sovereignty over the related continental shelf and the Arctic Archipelago. It considers the waters between the islands of the Archipelago to be Canadian Internal Waters. The United States among others considers those to be international waters.

Canada has more Arctic land mass than any other country but one of the smallest Arctic populations. Canada's Arctic land is included within the administrative regions of the Northwest Territories, Nunavut, and Yukon, although geographically and in some cases legally, parts of Newfoundland and Labrador and Northern Quebec are included as well. As of 2011, approximately 107,265 Canadians live in the Arctic.

History

Government interest in the North began with the English explorations of Frobisher and Davis in the 1500s and the 1670 Hudson's Bay Company (HBC) charter. The HBC charter gave the company title to Rupert's Land, the watershed of Hudson Bay. In 1821, the rest of the present-day Northwest Territories and Nunavut south of the Arctic coast was added to the charter. Then, in 1870, the Hudson's Bay Company transferred title to its lands to Canada with its purchase of Rupert's Land. Thus, the new dominion acquired legal sovereignty over all of what is now northern Canada except for the Arctic islands. This northern mainland sovereignty has never been questioned although there have been challenges to Canada's Arctic sovereignty in the past.

In 1880 the government of the United Kingdom of Great Britain and Ireland transferred to Canada the rest of its possessions in the Arctic, including "all Islands adjacent to any such Territories" whether discovered by British or foreigners, or not yet discovered.

Further historical information related to Canadian Arctic policy can be found in the sections which follow.

Geography

Definition of Arctic
The term "Arctic" varies in its usage. It can be defined as north of the Arctic Circle (66° 33'N). Alternatively, it can be defined as the region where the average temperature for the warmest month (July) is below ; the northernmost tree line roughly follows the isotherm at the boundary of this region. Socially and politically, the Arctic region includes the northern territories of the eight Arctic states, although by natural science definitions much of this territory is considered subarctic.

Canadian geographer Louis-Edmond Hamelin developed the nordicity index, having ten natural and human components:

latitude
summer heat
annual cold
types of ice
total precipitation
natural vegetation cover
accessibility by means other than air
air service
population
degree of economic activity

Using these components, he calculated regional values whereby he subdivided Canada into Near North, Middle North, Far North and Extreme North.

Population
A large part of Canada is in the Arctic region. Administratively this is split between the Northwest Territories, Nunavut, and Yukon. About 107,000 Canadians live in the Arctic. This compares with the other countries' Arctic regions as follows:

Russia – 2,000,000
USA – 731,449 (includes entire population of Alaska, most which is below the Arctic Circle)
Arctic Norway – 470,757
Iceland – 321,857
Sweden – 250,000
Finland – 184,000
Canada – 107,265 (includes entire population of Yukon, Northwest Territories, and Nunavut, much of which is below the Arctic Circle)
Denmark – 106,079 (Greenland and Faroe Islands)

Note: The statistic given for Iceland refers to its entire population. However, Iceland is almost entirely sub-Arctic, as are the Faroe Islands.

The Inuit
The Inuit are Aboriginal peoples originating in the Canadian Arctic and other polar nations. The word Inuit means "people" in Inuktitut, the language of the Inuit.

Although the 50,480 Inuit listed in the 2006 Canada Census can be found throughout Canada the majority, 44,470 (88.1%), live in four regions lying north of the 54th parallel.

As of the 2006 Canada Census there were 4,715 (9.3%) Inuit living in Newfoundland and Labrador and about 2,160 (4.3%) live in Nunatsiavut. There are also about 6,000 NunatuKavut people (Labrador Metis or Inuit-metis) living in southern Labrador in what is called NunatuKavut.

As of the 2006 Canada Census there were 4,165 (10.1%) Inuit living in the Northwest Territories. The majority, about 3,115 (6.2%), live in the six communities of the Inuvialuit Settlement Region.

As of the 2006 Canada Census there were 24,640 (84.0%) Inuit living in Nunavut. In Nunavut the Inuit population forms a majority in all communities and is the only jurisdiction of Canada where Aboriginal peoples form a majority.

As of the 2006 Canada Census there were 10,950 (21.7%) Inuit living in Quebec. The majority, about 9,565 (19.0%), live in Nunavik.

The Arctic Archipelago
Canadian sovereignty over the lands of the Arctic Archipelago is no longer disputed.

From 1898 to 1902 Otto Sverdrup explored in the high Arctic. He discovered the islands of Axel Heiberg, Ellef Ringnes and Amund Ringnes, known as Sverdrup Islands, and claimed them for Norway. He was the first known European to have set foot on them. Norway retained territorial interests in the islands until 1930 when it formally recognized the sovereignty of Britain (Canada) over them.

Historically, occupation of the land has been considered important in establishing sovereignty. This led to a variety of initiatives of the Canadian government. From 1953 to 1955, eighty-seven Inuit were moved by the Government of Canada to the High Arctic. In the 1990s this relocation became a point of controversial scrutiny. The government's motives seem to have included this need to occupy the land.

The waterways, including the Northwest Passage, within the Archipelago remain in dispute. Canada considers them internal waters while the United States considers them international waters.

Arctic Circle

The eight northern countries listed above all have territory within the Arctic Circle. Several of these make conflicting claims of sovereignty. The United States and Canada do not agree on their boundaries in the Beaufort Sea. Canada and Denmark both claim the small Hans Island off of Greenland. Russia, Denmark and Canada all claim common sections of the Lomonosov Ridge.

Policy statements
In 2007, the three Canadian territorial governments released "A Northern Vision: A Stronger North and a Better Canada". The vision's main themes are sovereignty, circumpolar relations and climate change.

In 2009, the Government of Canada presented Canada's Northern Strategy: Our North, Our Heritage, Our Future. It focused on four objectives:

On August 23, 2010, the Prime Minister of Canada, Stephen Harper said that protection of Canada's sovereignty over its northern regions was its number one and "non-negotiable priority" in Arctic policy. Canada has slated $109 million, to be spent before 2014, for research to substantiate extended continental shelf claims in the Arctic region.

Canada's Arctic policy priorities are:

Exercise Canadian sovereignty,
Promote economic and social development,
Protect the arctic environment, and
Improve and devolve governance.

The exercise of sovereignty

Canada has had historic difficulty supporting its Arctic claims of sovereignty due to the sparsity of population, remoteness, and difficulty in effectively demonstrating administrative capacity. Most challenges to Canada's arctic sovereignty have historically come from the United States. As claims of sovereignty in the Arctic solidified with the end of territorial disputes around the Alaska panhandles, Canada's efforts at demonstrating sovereignty have shifted from the mainland of the north, to the Arctic Archipelago. Most recently, Canada's claims that the marine passageways within the Archipelago are Canadian internal waters have been actively challenged by the United States, who claims instead that these are international waters.

In 1969, the SS Manhattan and, in 1985, the Polar Sea, both United States ships, sparked controversy in Canada by traveling through the waters of the Arctic Archipelago without the permission of Canada. Due to the remoteness of the area and a lack of capacity, Canada did not learn of the voyages until after they had occurred, a clear challenge to Canada's arctic claims. In the aftermath of both incidents, Canada strengthened its legislation covering such voyages and devoted additional attention to developing its capacity (both military and otherwise) for operating in the Arctic in support of its sovereignty claims.

Economic and social development
The Inuit have been hunters for millennia. As they interacted with Europeans they became trappers and dependent on foreign economic forces.

Education
ArcticNet's Schools on Board program is based out of The Clayton H. Riddell Faculty of Environment, Earth and Resources at the University of Manitoba in Winnipeg. It helps connect high schools across Canada with those conducting climate change research in the Arctic. They educate young Canadians concerning the challenges and career opportunities in Arctic research. Participating schools send students and teachers to the Arctic, on board CCGS Amundsen, to do field research with the ArcticNet science team.

Health Care
Policy concerns include adequate nutrition, suicide rates, toxic pollution, tuberculosis, and adequate housing.

Protection of the environment
Environmental concerns include global warming, preservation of flora and fauna, shipping traffic, and oil exploration. As a consequence of the SS Manhattan's venture through the Northwest Passage, the Canadian government enacted the Arctic Waters Pollution Prevention Act.

Improving and devolving governance
Canada has had a paternalistic relationship with its Aboriginal peoples in the past. The creation of Nunavut has helped promote self-government.

Scientific Research
Many Canadian institutions conduct research in the Arctic. As part of its Arctic policy, in the summer of 2010, the Canadian Government announced plans to build a High Arctic Research Station. This station will be built as an integral part of Canada's Northern Strategy and serves political purposes, such as asserting Canada's sovereignty in the high north, as much as concrete research objectives. Cambridge Bay was chosen after a feasibility study that also included Pond Inlet and Resolute as potential locations. It will be a year-round, multidisciplinary facility exploring the cutting-edge of Arctic science and technology issues; opening is foreseen in 2017. Total costs are as yet unknown, but pre-construction design alone is budgeted at C$18 million.

Legal landscape
Legislation governing Arctic policy is expanding due to the opportunities opened up by the melting of Arctic summer ice such as natural resource extraction and expedited shipping routes.

See also 

International initiatives
Arctic Council
Arctic Climate Impact Assessment
Arctic cooperation and politics
Arctic Environmental Protection Strategy
Arctic Ocean Conference
Arctic Search and Rescue Agreement
United Nations Convention on the Law of the Sea
Nation states policies
Arctic policy of European Union
Arctic policy of Denmark
Arctic policy of Finland
Arctic policy of Norway
Arctic policy of Russia
Arctic policy of Sweden
Arctic policy of the United States
Arctic policy of China
Arctic policy of South Korea
Foreign relations of Canada
Foreign relations of Canada (section Arctic disputes)
Arctic (section International cooperation and politics)
Canadian institutions
Canadian Polar Commission
Canadian Rangers
Inuit Tapiriit Kanatami
Canadian history
Nunavut Implementation Commission
Canadian individuals of influence
List of people from Nunavut
List of people from Yukon
:Category:People from the Northwest Territories
Nellie Cournoyea
Eva Aariak, former premier of Nunavut
Bill Lyall
Louis-Edmond Hamelin
Mary Simon
Carolyn Bennett, Liberal critic on Arctic policy
Vilhjalmur Stefansson, 1879–1962, explorer
Arctic concepts and terms
North Atlantic triangle
Territorial waters

References

External links 
Governance of Arctic Marine Shipping, a 2008 report from the Marine & Environmental Law Institute at Dalhousie Law School

Northern Canada
Canada